Milan Purović (born 7 May 1985) is a Montenegrin retired footballer who played as a centre forward.

Club career
Born in Titograd, Montenegro, Socialist Federal Republic of Yugoslavia, Purović made his professional debuts with FK Budućnost Podgorica. He then played for Red Star Belgrade from 2005 to 2007, alongside Nikola Žigić, with the strikers standing at respectively 193 and 202 cm.

Purović attracted interest from several clubs outside Serbia, and signed for Sporting Clube de Portugal in the summer of 2007. However, he only managed two Primeira Liga goals in his first season (six all competitions comprised), and would be loaned to Turkish Süper Lig side Kayserispor for 2008–09.

In 2009–10 another loan ensued, as Purović joined Hungary's Videoton FC. It would be however a short-lived one, as in early 2010 he moved to Slovenia with NK Olimpija Ljubljana on yet another loan. He split the following campaign between another two teams, C.F. Os Belenenses in the Portuguese second level and Cercle Brugge K.S.V. in Belgium, both still on loan from Sporting; he appeared in only 11 league matches for the two clubs combined.

On 27 July 2011, Purović terminated his contract with the Lisbon-based club and signed for OFK Beograd. On 9 April 2014, after featuring rarely for both FC Metalurh Zaporizhya and FK Bežanija, he joined Malaysia Super League team Perak FA, replacing departed foreign player Želimir Terkeš. He made his debut against Johor Darul Takzim FC, six days later.

International career
A member of the Montenegro national team, Purović made his debut against Hungary during his country's first international match as an independent country, on 24 March 2007. Previously, he represented Serbia and Montenegro under-21s at the 2006 UEFA European Under-21 Championship, alongside future Sporting teammates Vladimir Stojković and Simon Vukčević, and also appeared for FR Yugoslavia at the 2002 European Under-17 Championship.

He has earned a total of 7 caps, scoring no goals. His final international was a May 2008 friendly match away against Romania.

Honours
Red Star
Serbian SuperLiga: 2005–06, 2006–07 
Serbian Cup: 2005–06, 2006–07

Sporting
Taça de Portugal: 2007–08

References

External links

1985 births
Living people
Footballers from Podgorica
Association football forwards
Serbia and Montenegro footballers
Serbia and Montenegro under-21 international footballers
Montenegrin footballers
Montenegro international footballers
FK Budućnost Podgorica players
Red Star Belgrade footballers
Sporting CP footballers
Kayserispor footballers
Fehérvár FC players
NK Olimpija Ljubljana (2005) players
C.F. Os Belenenses players
Cercle Brugge K.S.V. players
OFK Beograd players
FC Metalurh Zaporizhzhia players
FK Bežanija players
Perak F.C. players
Kuantan FA players
FK Spartak Subotica players
FK Radnik Surdulica players
Second League of Serbia and Montenegro players
First League of Serbia and Montenegro players
Serbian SuperLiga players
Primeira Liga players
Süper Lig players
Nemzeti Bajnokság I players
Slovenian PrvaLiga players
Liga Portugal 2 players
Belgian Pro League players
Ukrainian Premier League players
Serbian First League players
Malaysia Super League players
Malaysia Premier League players
Montenegrin expatriate footballers
Expatriate footballers in Portugal
Montenegrin expatriate sportspeople in Portugal
Expatriate footballers in Turkey
Montenegrin expatriate sportspeople in Turkey
Expatriate footballers in Hungary
Montenegrin expatriate sportspeople in Hungary
Expatriate footballers in Slovenia
Montenegrin expatriate sportspeople in Slovenia
Expatriate footballers in Belgium
Montenegrin expatriate sportspeople in Belgium
Expatriate footballers in Serbia
Montenegrin expatriate sportspeople in Serbia
Expatriate footballers in Ukraine
Montenegrin expatriate sportspeople in Ukraine
Expatriate footballers in Malaysia
Montenegrin expatriate sportspeople in Malaysia